The Finnish Cup is Finland's main national cup competition in football. This yearly competition is open for all member clubs of the FA of Finland and has been played since 1955.

The winner qualifies for the UEFA Europa Conference League.

Finals

The performance of various clubs is shown in the following table:

Performance by club
The performance of various clubs is shown in the following table:

Performance by region

See also
Finnish League Cup

References

External links
Official page 
Finland - List of Cup Finals, RSSSF.com

 
1
National association football cups
Recurring sporting events established in 1955
1955 establishments in Finland